Kevran is a village in Gorno-Badakhshan Autonomous Region in the Panj valley. It is located on the border between Afghanistan and Tajikistan. Nearby is the larger town of Kalai-Khumb. It is part of the jamoat Vishkharv in Darvoz District.

References

Populated places in Gorno-Badakhshan